

Launch statistics

Rocket configurations

Launch sites

Launch outcomes

1980

1981

1982

1983

1984

1985

1986

1987

1988

1989

References

Atlas